The Oregon Ducks baseball team represents the University of Oregon in NCAA Division I college baseball in the Pac-12 Conference. The home games are played on campus at PK Park.

History
Oregon played its first baseball game in 1877 and established the program in 1885.

The UO team made one College World Series appearance, in 1954, and was eliminated from the tournament after losing to Arizona and Massachusetts. A decade later in 1964, in the re-organized Athletic Association of Western Universities, Oregon was once again North Division champions, but lost at defending national champion USC in the district finals (today's super-regionals).

After the 1981 season, baseball and three other varsity sports were dropped by the university (men's gymnastics, women's golf, and women's soccer) due to a budget crisis, and baseball became a club sport in March 1983.

In July 2007, the university announced that it would again field a varsity baseball team, beginning with the 2009 season.  One reason was the success of the rival Oregon State Beavers, who had repeated as College World Series champions a month earlier.

In the Ducks' first game in PK Park, they defeated the defending national champions, the Fresno State Bulldogs, 1–0 on a walk-off single by senior Andrew Schmidt. A sellout crowd of 2,777 was on hand for the game. After his eleventh season in 2019, head coach George Horton and the Ducks mutually agreed to part ways on May 28. Two weeks later on June 11, it was announced that Mark Wasikowski was the successor; he was previously an assistant at Oregon from 2012 through 2016, then was the head coach at Purdue in the Big Ten Conference. In his first full season as head coach of the Ducks, they hosted a regional as the 13th seed and finished second behind LSU.

Stadium

The Ducks previously played baseball at Howe Field, south of McArthur Court, named in 1936 for Dr. Herbert Crombie Howe (1872–1940), the former chairman of the English department.  Howe started teaching at UO in 1901 and was its original faculty representative to the Pacific Coast Conference in 1915, partially responsible for the league's founding. When the university dropped baseball after the 1981 season, the succeeding club team continued at Howe; the field was converted to use by the Ducks' women's softball team in 1987. Softball was formerly played at Amazon Park.

Baseball became a club sport in 1983 and Oregon was the only Pac-10 school without a varsity baseball program through 2008. Following the reinstatement of baseball, announced in 2007, the university built PK Park, directly northeast of Autzen Stadium, formerly paved parking spaces. It opened for the Ducks in 2009 and since 2010, the park is also home for the minor league Eugene Emeralds of the short season Northwest League, whose season runs from mid-June through August.

Yearly Awards

Pac-12 Player of the Year
Aaron Zavala (2021)

Pac-12 Pitcher of the Year
Alex Keudell (2011)

Yearly results
Oregon notes their first year of baseball as 1877, with 1906 as the first recorded season.

Oregon in the Pac-12 tournament

Oregon in the NCAA tournament
The NCAA Division I baseball tournament started in 1947.
The format of the tournament has changed through the years.

Current roster

Former players
 Tyler Anderson
 Steve Baker
 Tom Dodd
 Kyle Garlick
 Joe Gordon, Hall of Famer as a second baseman
 Ryon Healy
 Cole Irvin
 Stephen Nogosek
 Don Reynolds
 Dave Roberts
 Jimmie Sherfy
 Ray Smith
 Spencer Steer
 Zack Thornton
 David Peterson
 Kenyon Yovan
 Robby Ahlstrom
 Aaron Zavala
 Hunter Breault

See also
List of NCAA Division I baseball programs

References

External links

 
1876 establishments in Oregon
Baseball teams disestablished in 1981
Baseball teams established in 2009